Meliata is a village and municipality in the Rožňava District in the Košice Region of middle-eastern Slovakia.

History
In historical records the village was first mentioned in 1243.

Geography
The village lies at an altitude of 224 metres and covers an area of 14.49 km².
It has a population of about 215 people.
Its Hungarian name is Melléte.

Culture
The village has a public library and a football pitch.
The mayor of the village is Csaba Husaník.

External links
http://www.meliata.sk/
https://web.archive.org/web/20080208225314/http://www.statistics.sk/mosmis/eng/run.html

Villages and municipalities in Rožňava District